Major-General Bertram Reveley Mitford  (6 February 1863 – 23 February 1936) was a British Army officer.

Military career
Mitford was commissioned into the Buffs (Royal East Kent Regiment) in 1882. He transferred to the Egyptian Army in January 1886 and back to the British Army in January 1897. After seeing action in the Dongola Campaign, he went to South Africa during the Second Boer War. Following the end of this war in June 1902, he stayed on as assistant adjutant-general to the Forces in South Africa, stationed in the Pretoria district. He became commander of the 6th Infantry Brigade in December 1906 and then commander of the 9th Infantry Brigade in May 1907.

He went on to command the 72nd Infantry Brigade in 1914 and deployed to the Western Front where he took part at the Battle of Loos in September 1915 and the Battle of the Somme in autumn 1916. He then became General Officer Commanding 42nd (East Lancashire) Infantry Division in March 1917, again on the Western Front, and took part in the Battle of Passchendaele in autumn 1917. He handed over his command in October 1917.

References

1863 births
1936 deaths
Companions of the Order of the Bath
Companions of the Order of St Michael and St George
Companions of the Distinguished Service Order
British Army major generals
Buffs (Royal East Kent Regiment) officers
British Army personnel of the Second Boer War